The Olympus E-10 is a digital single-lens reflex camera with a 4.0-megapixel CCD image sensor that was introduced in 2000. Unlike most digital SLRs the camera is not a system camera – its lens is fixed to the body. It has a TTL optical viewfinder, and a 4× optical zoom lens with lens aperture f/2–2.4. Instead of a moving (reflex) mirror a beam splitting fixed (non-reflex) prism is used to split the image between the optical viewfinder and CCD. Thus it was possible to have a live view on the LCD and in parallel see the image in the TTL viewfinder.

It was succeeded by the 5-megapixel Olympus E-20, announced in 2001.

References

External links

Product reviews
 DPReview.com's review of the E-10
 Sample photos from an E-10

Bridge digital cameras
E-10
Cameras introduced in 2000